One Floor Below is a 2015 Romanian drama film directed by Radu Muntean. It was screened in the Un Certain Regard section at the 2015 Cannes Film Festival. It was screened in the Contemporary World Cinema section of the 2015 Toronto International Film Festival.

References

External links

2015 films
2015 drama films
Romanian drama films
2010s Romanian-language films
Films directed by Radu Muntean